The 2016 Ligas Superiores, the fifth division of Peruvian football (soccer), will be played by variable number teams by Departament. The tournaments will be played on a home-and-away round-robin basis.

Liga Superior de Lambayeque

Serie A

Serie B

Liga Superior de Piura

Serie A

Serie B

Semifinals

Final

Liga Superior de Tumbes

Serie A

Serie B

Cuadrangular Final

External links
 DeChalaca.com - copaperu.pe la información más completa del "fútbol macho" en todo el Perú

2016
5